Belinda Dann (4 July 1900 – 9 October 2007) was an Indigenous Australian born as Quinlyn Warrakoo to an Irish cattle station manager and a Nykina mother.

Biography 
Born in Lunlungai community, Derby, Western Australia, at the age of 8 she was taken away and sent to Beagle Bay Mission with other members of the stolen generation. Her name was changed to Belinda Boyd to integrate with White society.

She married Mathias Dann.

In May 2007 she met her 97-year-old brother, Patty Jungine, for the first time. Jungine died a month later in June 2007, and Dann died four months afterward in Port Hedland at age 107.

Dann's funeral in Port Hedland attracted over 200 mourners on Saturday 27 October 2007, and was followed two weeks later by a traditional ceremony at Lunlungaim, where a lock of her hair was buried alongside her mother's grave.

References

External links
Stolen generation member dies just months after reunion
Pilbara woman dies at 107
Stolen generation survivor dies – Aboriginal/Australia
Stolen generation survivor dies – Sydney Morning Herald
Port Hedland celebrates Belinda Dann 107th birthday
 Stolen child became a pillar of the community – SMH
Jarlmadangah community website

1900 births
2007 deaths
Indigenous Australians from Western Australia
People from Derby, Western Australia
Australian centenarians
Australian people of Irish descent
Members of the Stolen Generations
Women centenarians